was a railway station located in Suzu, Ishikawa Prefecture, Japan. This station was abandoned on April 1, 2005.

Line
 Noto Railway
 Noto Line

Adjacent stations

External links 
 Minami-Kuromaru Station page at notor.info

Railway stations in Ishikawa Prefecture
Defunct railway stations in Japan
Railway stations closed in 2005
Railway stations in Japan opened in 1964